The Most-Litvínov tramway network is a tram network connecting the city of Most and the town of Litvínov in the Ústí nad Labem Region.

This network is unique in Europe; since tram networks are typically designed to provide public transport for cities, this system is unique for connecting two towns of a combined population of less than 80,000 inhabitants.

History

Early 20th century
The city of Most strived to become an important center in the area, but there was a lack of functioning local transport. Absence of transport infrastructure in densely populated and built-up agglomeration, which was formed between Most and Litvínov at the end of the century required a progressive solution. In 1893, Carl von Pohnert considered connecting two towns by road steam tram. Pohnert submitted the idea in 1896 and on 22 February 1899, the project received (by decree no. 570682/3) permission from the railways ministry to start construction. 

On 7 August 1901, the operation of the  single-track railway was inaugurated. In September 1902, Brüxer Strassenbahn-und Elektricitäts-Gesellschaft was founded.

The network was not extended any further until the end of World War II. In 1938, a smaller extension was made to the petrochemical plants in Záluží, a village that is a part of Litvínov. These were of strategic importance during World War II. Towards the end of the war, in 1945, the chemical plants in and around Most were bombed. Subsequently, the tramway was destroyed. The bombing caused a temporary split of the Litvínov and Most sections.

Late 20th century
After the war, reconstruction of tracks was necessary. This was done within a few months after the end of World War II. 

In the 1950s, five tram lines were in operation in Most and new T1 trams appeared. Another important task was the modernisation of the interurban line. A decision was taken to build a modern, fast standard-gauge line. Its first section was put into operation in Litvínov on 1 April 1957.

In connection with this, the old tram cars of wooden construction had to be scrapped and were replaced by Tatra T1, T2 and later T3 trams.

Operation of narrow-gauge trams was definitively terminated on 24 March 1961. In the 1970s, the tram network as well as the whole city of Most, had to prepare for the relocation. However, thanks to previous modifications, the relocation turned out easy. In the same year, the line to the new Most railway station was also built.

On 1 January 1995, during the process of privatization of state-owned enterprises DOPRAVNÍ PODNIK měst Mostu a Litvínova, a.s. (referred to as DPmML) was established as successor to the state-owned enterprise.

Current status
Most of the fleet consists of modernised Tatra T3 trams, with two Škoda 03T low-floor cars also in service. 

In 2012-2014, two low-floor VarioLF plus trams were delivered and a few years later, two VarioLF cars were also put into service. During 2013, the surplus Tatra T3SUCS cars were sold to various Ukraine tramway operations, especially to Odessa. Trams now run on four lines 1-4 with no plans to expand the network for the time being. A major project will be the complete; the reconstruction of the intercity rapid transit system which is expected to begin in 2020 and end two years later.

Routes
Four routes feature on the network.

The tram lines 2 and 4 are the basis of the operation, with a connection between them at the stop "Most, Zimní stadion". During the peak hours of the working day, their connections are interspersed with line 3, which provides a direct connection between Litvínov and Most railway station. Lines 1 and 3 are variants of line 4. Until August 2011, line 7 was a variant of line 4 before its cancellation.

Intervals and frequency
 Line 1 operates only a few connections on weekdays (6 pairs in 2016), mostly from Litvínov to Most in the morning and mostly from Most to Litvínov in the afternoon.
 Line 2 central to the town of Most and line 4 between Most to Litvínov are most regular. 
 Both lines run daily at regular intervals with a 15-minute intervals for most of the working day, and mostly 30-minute intervals on Saturdays, Sundays and evenings. 
 Two night services from Litvínov to Most and one night service from Most to Litvínov arrive at the railway station in Most - they are shown on the timetable for line 3.
 Two pairs of night services running daily are also listed as line 4 services.

Rolling stock

Currently, passenger trams of these types are in operation in Most and Litvínov:

The original prototype of the experimental Tatra T5B6 (carrying registration No. 273) as the only ever tramcar of this type to be produced is still in Most and Litvínov, however it does not see active service and is kept only as an historic vehicle.

See also
 List of tram and light rail transit systems 
 List of town tramway systems in the Czech Republic

References

Bibliography

External links

 DOPRAVNÍ PODNIK měst Mostu a Litvínova, a.s.

600 V DC railway electrification
Tram transport in the Czech Republic
Town tramway systems by city
Most (city)